Statistics of 1. deild in the 1991 season.

Overview
It was contested by 10 teams, and KÍ Klaksvík won the championship.

League standings

Results
The schedule consisted of a total of 14 games. Each team played two games against every opponent in no particular order. One of the games was at home and one was away.

Top goalscorers
Source: faroesoccer.com

Top goalscorers

1. deild seasons
Faroe
Faroe
1